Scott-Elliot may refer to:
 George Francis Scott-Elliot (1862–1934), a South African botanist
 Walter Scott-Elliot (1895–1977), a British company director and politician
 William Scott-Elliot (1849–1919), a theosophist

See also
Scott (surname)
Elliot (surname)

Compound surnames
English-language surnames